The Deutsche Börse Cloud Exchange AG (DBCE) is a joint venture, established in May 2013, between Deutsche Börse AG and Zimory GmbH. It operates an international marketplace for buying and selling of cloud resources.
Users of the marketplace can either cover their additional storage and computing requirements or offer IaaS capacities.
Begin of February 2016 DBCE publicly announced discontinuing their operations with March 2016 on the website www.cloud.exchange with the following message:

"Deutsche Börse Cloud Exchange discontinues operations

Dear visitor,

The shareholders of the Deutsche Börse Cloud Exchange decided to cease operations of the marketplace while evaluating the business model and approach. The company ended registration for new users of the marketplace on January 18. Existing contracts will be fulfilled until they expire in accordance with the individual agreements. The public marketplace was scheduled to be retired in March 2016.

We thank you for your interest, cooperation and support. Please contact us directly in case of further questions.

The DBCE team"

Marketplace 
The vendor-agnostic IaaS marketplace of the DBCE functions as a neutral intermediary between cloud providers and cloud users. In the marketplace, providers offer IT infrastructure resources such as CPU, storage and RAM as a service. On the other side, buyers have the opportunity to search for, buy and subsequently use appropriate IaaS offers from providers. 
The access to the marketplace is reserved only to companies  and is not open to private individuals.

Up to now, the marketplace of the DBCE is the only platform worldwide on which IaaS resources can be compared, purchased, used and paid for on a standardized basis. This makes individual offers of providers directly comparable, creating transparency for the buyer.

History 
In 2013, the DBCE was established as a joint venture between Deutsche Börse AG and Zimory GmbH. The beginning of 2014 marked the beta launch of the cloud marketplace, in which various providers already linked their services with the marketplace.
The official launch of the marketplace was on May 20, 2015. To start off, five providers from various European countries offered their IaaS resources via the DBCE.

Technology 
In contrast to other marketplaces for cloud services, the DBCE seeks to make available vendor-agnostic cloud resources procured via the marketplace. It does so by means of the system behind the trading platform. It offers a central interface (API) for all standard cloud technologies and enables the provision of the purchased resources independent of the technologies being used by the customers. It therefore enables companies to liberate themselves from proprietary systems.

Security  
In order to guarantee the quality and security of the services, DBCE, in cooperation with TÜV Rheinland developed a special testing procedure for providers as a prerequisite for access to the marketplace. For existing suppliers in the marketplace, an annual review of various parameters is conducted, including performance of the services offered, as well as modifications at the storage location of the servers.

Standards  
The marketplace is based, above all, on a consistent standardization concept. In addition to a standardized seek and buy procedure, the agreements between buyers and DBCE are standardized as well. This is intended to accelerate the normally drawn-out contract negotiations between providers and users  in the cloud sector. What's more, the DBCE acts as a controlling entity and thus ensures that certain security and compliance procedures will always be upheld.

The services traded via the marketplace are also standardized in order to enable a comparison of the individual provider offers. Storage is available in blocks of 100 gigabytes, memory in gibibytes, and for compute resources, the DBCE introduced the performance unit (PU). This is where the DBCE differentiates itself from other cloud providers. Because different CPU offers are normally difficult to compare, the DBCE specifies the PU as a defined standard for all CPU offers in the marketplace. Which means it does not matter from which provider the buyer is procuring CPU resources via the marketplace: The PU always delivers comparable performance, independent of the underlying hardware.

Staff  
The DBCE has 49 employees, comprising experts from the cloud computing industry and the financial sector. The members of the management board of the Deutsche Börse Cloud Exchange AG are Randolf Roth and Maximilian Ahrens.

External links 
 Deutsche Börse Cloud Exchange AG
 Zimory

See also  
Cloud Computing
 Iaas

References 

Cloud computing providers
Deutsche Börse